Aurat Aurat Aurat is a 1996 Bollywood film starring Rekha, Rakesh Roshan, Vinod Mehra, Aruna Irani and Sadashiv Amrapurkar. Actually, the film shooting started in 1979, but got delayed and later completed in 1994. It was released in 1996. The film was one of many of Vinod Mehra's posthumous releases as he died six years before the film's release.

Synopsis
Seeta (Rekha) is standing trial for the murder of Brij (Sadashiv Amrapurkar). In flashbacks it is revealed what drove her to commit murder.

Rakesh (Rakesh Roshan), a spoilt rich man, fell in love with her. She was engaged to Vijay (Vinod Mehra). Rakesh got Vijay killed by hiring Brij. Seeta moved on with her life, devastated by her fiancé's death. She marries a barrister named Vajpayee (Shreeram Lagoo) and is shocked when she discovers by coincidence that her husband's son from a previous marriage is Rakesh.

Cast
Rekha as Seeta Vajpayee
Rakesh Roshan as Rakesh Vajpayee
Vinod Mehra as Vijay
Aruna Irani as Aruna
Neeta Mehta as Savitri
Shreeram Lagoo as Barrister Vajpayee
Sadashiv Amrapurkar as Brij

Music
The music composed by Laxmikant-Pyarelal with lyrics by Anand Bakshi.

External links
Aurat Aurat Aurat at IMDB

1990s Hindi-language films
Films directed by K. Viswanath
Films scored by Laxmikant–Pyarelal